The Saxon class I T were a class of 19 German 0-4-4-0 Meyer tank locomotives built for the Royal Saxon State Railways (K.Sä.St.E) for service of the . The Deutsche Reichsbahn assigned them to Class 98.0.

History 

Near Dresden, the Royal Saxon State Railways had the Windbergbahn, a branch line primarily serving coal traffic, which, in addition to a steep incline, also had a minimum curve of only  in radius. At the turn of the century, the performance of the previously used locomotives of the VII T class was no longer sufficient. The reasons for this were the onset of excursion traffic as well as increasing transport volumes in coal transport. Between 1910 and 1914, the Sächsische Maschinenfabrik delivered a total of 19 locomotives in 3 lots, which were largely similar in their design to the tried and tested narrow-gauge locomotives of the IV K class. The construction lots differed in terms of their service weights and external design. They were popularly known as "Windberglok" or "Cross spider".

Three locomotives were lost in World War I; the Deutsche Reichsbahn took over the remaining 15 locomotives in 1920 and gave them the numbers 98 001 to 98 015. Like all locomotives of the 98 series, the machines were thus classified as local railway locomotives.

All the remaining locomotives survived World War II. Two locomotives were badly damaged in the air raid on 13 February 1945, but were rebuilt. They continued to be used on their main line in passenger and freight traffic. Between 1952 and 1962 they were used double-heading uranium ore block trains to Dresden-Gittersee. The trains consisted of 10 wagons with a capacity of 20 tons each. The eight remaining locomotives transported 560,000 tons of uranium ore to Gittersee every year. The last class 98.0 was retired in 1968.

The 98 001 (ex K.SäSt.E. 1394) has been preserved and is part of the holdings of the Dresden Transport Museum. It is currently on loan at the Industrial Museum in Chemnitz.

Technical features 
The locomotives had a two-ring boiler with a Crampton firebox. Two non-lifting Friedmann injectors were used to feed the boiler. From 1914, those of the Winzer type were also used.

The steam circuit was designed as a four-cylinder compound drive with Walschaerts valve gear (Heusinger) and flat slide valves. The smaller high-pressure cylinders were on the front, the larger low-pressure cylinders on the rear bogie. The bogies were connected by a coupling iron in order to reduce any counter-rotating movements.

The water supply was housed in side tanks, the coal in a bunker behind the driver's cab.

The locomotives were factory-fitted with a Westinghouse air brake, supplemented by a counterweight brake. As special equipment, they were provided with a Latowski-type of steam-driven bell.

References 
 
 
 
 
 
 

 

0-4-4-0T locomotives
01 TV
Sächsische Maschinenfabrik locomotives
Railway locomotives introduced in 1910
Standard gauge locomotives of Germany
Meyer locomotives